Mounsey is a surname. Notable people with the surname include:

Ann Mounsey (1811–1891), British organist and composer
Augustus Henry Mounsey (1834–1882), British diplomat
Elizabeth Mounsey (1819–1905), British organist and composer, sister of Ann
Rob Mounsey (born 1952), American musician, composer, and arranger
Tara Mounsey (born 1978), American ice hockey player
William Mounsey (disambiguation), multiple people